WNAC may refer to:

WNAC-TV, a television station (channel 12 digital/PSIP 64) licensed to Providence, Rhode Island, United States
WNAC-TV (Boston), a television station (channel 7) formerly licensed to Boston, Massachusetts, United States, which operated from June 1948 to May 1982
WHDH (TV), a television station (channel 42 digital/PSIP 7) licensed to Boston, Massachusetts, United States, which is the successor to the former WNAC-TV
WRKO, a radio station (680 AM) licensed to Boston, Massachusetts, United States, which formerly used the call sign WNAC
WBIX, a radio station (1260 AM) licensed to Boston, Massachusetts, United States, which formerly used the call sign WNAC
WBZ-FM, a radio station (98.5 FM) licensed to Boston, Massachusetts, United States, which formerly used the call sign WNAC-FM